Ebony Park is a suburb in Midrand, north-east of Johannesburg, South Africa. It is located in Region A of the City of Johannesburg Metropolitan Municipality next to Ivory Park.

References

Johannesburg Region A
Townships in Gauteng